Marangon is an Italian surname. Notable people with the surname include:

Doniéber Alexander Marangon (born 1979), Brazilian football goalkeeper
Edu Marangon (born 1963), retired Brazilian football player and manager
Fabio Marangon (born 1962), retired Italian football player; brother of Luciano Marangon
João Paulo Fernando Marangon (born 1989), Brazilian footballer
Lisa Marangon (born 1980), Australian professional triathlete
Luciano Marangon (born 1956), retired Italian football player
Renzo Marangon (born 1955), Italian politician

Italian-language surnames